Fazal bin Muhammad bin Ali (Arabic: فضل بن محمد بن علي,; born 1016 - 1084) commonly known as "Abu Ali Farmadi" or just "Abu Ali" was a saint of the Naqshbandi Golden Chain, and a prominent Sufi master and preacher from Ṭūs, Khorasan  Iran. He is well known for being a teacher of Al-Ghazali during his youth.

Birth 
He was born in the year 407 AH. He was called al-Fārmadī on account of his place of birth, Fārmad, a village in the vicinity of Ṭūs.

Education 
After completing his elementary education he entered the madrasah of the famous Sufi Abdulkarim Qushayri in Nishapur and then he was a follower of Abu Al-Hassan Al-Kharqani. He was the disciple of Imam Abu Qasim Qaisheri and Sheikh Abu Qasim Jurjani. In his last days he got spiritual favours from Sheikh Abdul Hasan Qarqani.

Biography 
Abu ali Farmadi is called the Knower of the Merciful and the Custodian of Divine Love. He was a scholar of the Shafi’i school of jurisprudence and a unique `arif (endowed with spiritual knowledge). He was deeply involved in both the School of the Salaf (scholars of the first and second centuries AH) and that of the Khalaf (later scholars), but he made his mark in the Science of Tasawwuf. From it he extracted some of the heavenly knowledge which is mentioned in the Qur’an in reference to al-Khidr salla: “and We have taught him from our Heavenly Knowledge” [18:65].

Death 
He died on 4 Rabi-Ul-Awwal 477 AH on Thursday.

External links 
“Hazrat Abu Ali Farmadi رحمتاالله علیه ”.

References 

Sunni Sufis
1016 births
1084 deaths